Michael Leonard Williams  (9 July 1935 – 11 January 2001) was a British actor who played both classical and comedy roles. He was best known for co-starring in the sitcom A Fine Romance with his wife Dame Judi Dench, and for voicing Dr. Watson in the long running Sherlock Holmes adaptations for BBC Radio.

Early life and career 
Williams was born in Liverpool, Lancashire.

Personal life 
Williams married Judi Dench on 5 February 1971, the same year that they co-starred in a stage production of John Webster's The Duchess of Malfi. They had one daughter, Tara Cressida Williams (b. 1972), known as Finty Williams, who is also an actress. Williams was also godfather to the actor Rory Kinnear.

He was the President of the Roman Catholic Actors' Guild.

Shortly before his death from lung cancer at the age of 65, Williams was appointed a Knight of St Gregory (KSG) by Pope John Paul II for his contribution to Catholic life in Britain. The honour was officially bestowed upon him at home on 10 January 2001. He died the next day, and was buried in the churchyard of St Leonard's, the Anglican parish church of Charlecote, Warwickshire. Williams was a fan of Everton FC.

Filmography

Film

Television

Select radio roles

Stage roles
Principal stage appearances; mostly with the Royal Shakespeare Company:

Also appeared in the Royal Shakespeare Company's Theatre-Go-Round Festival, Round House Theatre, London, 1970.

References

External links
 
 Performances listed in Theatre Archive, University of Bristol

1935 births
2001 deaths
20th-century English male actors
Alumni of RADA
Deaths from lung cancer in England
Dench family
English male film actors
English male radio actors
English male stage actors
English male television actors
English Roman Catholics
Male actors from Liverpool
People educated at St Edward's College
Royal Shakespeare Company members